The Civil War is a 1995 video game by British studio Dagger Interactive Technologies and published by Empire for DOS.

Gameplay
The Civil War is a real-time strategy game involving training, production and supply.

Reception

The game received a mixed-to-negative review from Computer Game Review. In 1996, Computer Gaming World declared The Civil War the 10th-worst computer game ever released.

Reviews
PC Gamer (1995 May)
Computer Gaming World (Sep, 1995)
LeveL (Czech magazine) #8 (09/1995)

References

1995 video games
American Civil War video games
DOS games
DOS-only games
Empire Interactive games
Real-time strategy video games
Video games developed in the United Kingdom